Coptodisca arbutiella, the madrone shield bearer, is a moth of the family Heliozelidae. It was described by August Busck in 1904. It is found in western North America from California to British Columbia.

The larvae feed on Arbutus species. They mine the leaves of their host plant. The mine is blotch-like. Full-grown larvae cut out elliptical cases out of the upper and lower leaf surfaces, in which pupation takes place.

References

Moths described in 1904
Heliozelidae